Martin Vavák (born 4 March 1994, in Trenčín) is a Slovak football midfielder who currently plays for the Corgoň Liga club Spartak Myjava.

Career
He made his professional debut for Spartak Myjava against FC Nitra on 5 October 2013 when he was brought on as a substitute in place of Pavol Kosík.
He ended his career in 2014.

External links
Spartak Myjava profile 
Corgoň Liga profile

References

1994 births
Living people
Slovak footballers
Association football midfielders
Spartak Myjava players
Slovak Super Liga players
Sportspeople from Trenčín